Alroey Cohen is an Israeli former footballer who last played for Maccabi Petah Tikva.

Club career statistics
(correct as of November 2010)

Honours
Liga Leumit (1):
2009–10
Israel State Cup (2):
2011, 2012

References

1989 births
Israeli Jews
Living people
Israeli footballers
Israel international footballers
Hapoel Ironi Kiryat Shmona F.C. players
Hapoel Tel Aviv F.C. players
Maccabi Petah Tikva F.C. players
Israeli Premier League players
People from Katzrin
Association football forwards